The IMKO-1 ( (ИМКО-1), Individual micro computer) was the first Bulgarian personal computer, built in 1979 in Pravetz, Bulgaria. It was the first in the Pravetz series 8 range of computers. As the other computers in the series, it is an Apple II clone.

Overview
The development of the first Bulgarian microcomputer started back in 1979 at the Institute for technical cybernetics and robotics. The first working samples were manufactured in 1980. The abbreviation IMKO stands for "Individual Micro Computer". This model is an analogue of the Apple II Plus and only about 50 units were manufactured for testing purposes.

Start of production: 1980.
End of production: 1982.
Processor: 6502, 1 MHz.
Memory (RAM): 48KB (with the possibility to extend to 64KB).
Memory (ROM): 12KB.
Disk drives: No disk drives available, only a cassette player port.
Operating system: None.
Screen resolution: Text mode 40×24 (columns/rows), graphics mode 280×192 pixels - 6 colours,
280×160 pixels + 4 text rows, 40×40 pixels + 4 text rows, 40×48 pixels in 16 colours.
Variations: None.
Notes: Manufactured as an experimental model at the Institute for cybernetics and robotics 
at the Bulgarian Academy of Science. It was well accepted due to its low price for its time as well 
as due to its universal features and ease of use. It was first presented to the foreign audience in 
1981 at the symposium on robotics in England as part of the demonstration of a robot arm (ROBKO-01).At that time the robots in Japan and the USA were controlled by minicomputers, not microcomputers like IMKO-1 and this demonstration was a real success as the whole system cost tens of times less than the Japanese or American analogues. As all computers of the Pravetz series this model has hardware Cyrillic support, but because the keyboard was using 7 bits for transmitting the character codes the Cyrillic letters were overlapping the lower case Latin letters and it was only possible to type with upper case Latin or Cyrillic letters.
Ports/slots: Cassette player port, 8 expansion slots. The zero slot was used for attaching extra 
memory up to the 64KB limit.
Manufacturer: ITCR - Sofia.
Price: N/A (never sold).

External links
http://www.homecomputer.de/pages/easteurope_bu.html

Personal computers
Apple II clones